St. Agnes' Priory (Sankt Agnetekloster) was a Danish convent for women of the Dominican Order. It was situated in Roskilde and was in operation  from 1264 until the Danish Reformation. .

History
In 1264, St. Agnes' Priory was founded north of the city outside the walls.
Princess Agnes of Denmark   (1249–ca 1288) served as its first prioress from 1264-1266. 
Her sister Jutta of Denmark (ca. 1246 - 1284) was prioress in 1266-1270.  
Princess Agnes and Jutta were both daughters of King Erik Plovpenning (c. 1216– 1250).  

Both princesses were placed in the convent  by Queen Margaret Sambiria  (1230-1282)  while she served  as regent during the minority of her son, King Eric V of Denmark (1249–1286). The sisters  brought with them their inheritance, including several large properties. The sisters disliked  life as nuns and both left the convent in 1270. They  retracted their property and  afterwards the courts heard the complaints of the nuns' legal representatives. Finally, a court ruling in 1284 ordered the crown to hand over the inheritance to the sisters.

King Erik Menved donated a large property including a mill to the nuns in 1295. The monastery eventually acquired properties in numerous Zealand villages. 
St. Agnes' Priory became a rich institution with members normally  from the highest Danish nobility. At its height there was room to house  30 nuns. The priory seemed to attract more financial support than the neighboring Dominican Monastery of  St. Catherine's Priory, Roskilde. It eventually owned more than 70 farms in Zealand, which had been donated for maintenance and income.  The priory also owned two bath houses in the town as additional income properties.

Dissolution
The Reformation brought the nunnery at Roskilde to an end. The properties of the nuns were confiscated as early as 1527. In 1536 Denmark became officially Lutheran, rejecting all Catholic institutions and most traditions. In 1572,  St. Agnes' Priory and its holding came under the control of Tryggevælde.

References

External links
 Skt. Agnete Kloster history

Dominican monasteries in Denmark
1264 establishments in Europe
Dominican convents
Buildings and structures in Region Zealand
History of Roskilde
13th-century establishments in Denmark
Monasteries dissolved under the Danish Reformation